Thymoquinone is a phytochemical compound found in the plant Nigella sativa. It is also found in select cultivated Monarda fistulosa plants which can be steam distilled to produce an essential oil.

It has been classified as a pan-assay interference compound, which binds indiscriminately to many proteins. It is under preliminary research to identify its possible biological properties.

See also 
 Dithymoquinone, a dimer of thymoquinone
 2,5-Dimethoxy-p-cymene

References 

1,4-Benzoquinones
Monoterpenes
Isopropyl compounds